Duthiers is a surname. Notable people with the surname include:

Gérard de Lacaze-Duthiers (1876–1958), French anarchist writer
Henri de Lacaze-Duthiers (1821–1901), French biologist, anatomist, and zoologist
Vladimir Duthiers (born 1969), American television journalist